Iron Mask may refer to:

 Iron Mask (band), a Belgian power metal band
 The Iron Mask, a 1929 American adventure film
 Le Masque de fer, a 1962 French film also released as The Iron Mask
 Viy 2: Journey to China, a 2019 Russian-Chinese adventure film released in English-speaking countries as Iron Mask or The Iron Mask

See also
 Man in the Iron Mask (disambiguation)